Chalepus is a genus of tortoise beetles and hispines in the family Chrysomelidae. There are more than 90 described species in Chalepus.

Species
These 98 species belong to the genus Chalepus:

 Chalepus acuticornis (Chapuis, 1877)
 Chalepus aeneiceps Pic, 1937
 Chalepus aeneicollis Uhmann, 1930
 Chalepus aenescens Weise, 1910
 Chalepus alternevittatus Pic, 1932
 Chalepus amabilis Baly, 1885
 Chalepus americanus (Wickham, 1914)
 Chalepus amiculus Baly, 1885
 Chalepus angulosus Baly, 1885
 Chalepus asperifrons (Chapuis, 1877)
 Chalepus assmanni Uhmann, 1936
 Chalepus aurantiacicollis Pic, 1931
 Chalepus bacchus (Newman, 1840)
 Chalepus badeni (Chapuis, 1877)
 Chalepus balli Uhmann, 1936
 Chalepus basilaris (Chapuis, 1877)
 Chalepus bellulus (Chapuis, 1877)
 Chalepus bicolor (Olivier, 1792)
 Chalepus bicoloriceps Pic, 1931
 Chalepus binotaticollis Pic, 1931
 Chalepus bivittatus Pic, 1932
 Chalepus breveapicalis Pic, 1931
 Chalepus brevicornis (Baly, 1885)
 Chalepus caracasensis Pic, 1931
 Chalepus cautus Weise, 1911
 Chalepus cincticollis Weise, 1905
 Chalepus clypeatus Baly, 1885
 Chalepus consanguineus Baly, 1885
 Chalepus consimilis Weise, 1905
 Chalepus cordiger (Chapuis, 1877)
 Chalepus cyanescens Spaeth, 1937
 Chalepus cyanicornis Spaeth, 1937
 Chalepus deborrei (Chapuis, 1877)
 Chalepus digressus Baly, 1885
 Chalepus dorni Uhmann, 1930
 Chalepus dorsalis
 Chalepus erosus Uhmann, 1948
 Chalepus flaveolus (Chapuis, 1877)
 Chalepus flexuosus (Guérin-Méneville in Cuvier, 1844)
 Chalepus forticornis Weise, 1905
 Chalepus garleppi Uhmann, 1939
 Chalepus generosus Baly, 1885
 Chalepus germaini Pic, 1931
 Chalepus guatemalanus Pic, 1934
 Chalepus hepburni Baly, 1885
 Chalepus horni Baly, 1885
 Chalepus lateralis Baly, 1885
 Chalepus lineatus
 Chalepus lineola (Chapuis, 1877)
 Chalepus longehumeralis Pic, 1931
 Chalepus marginatus Baly, 1885
 Chalepus marginiventris (Chapuis, 1877)
 Chalepus modestus Weise, 1911
 Chalepus monilicornis Weise, 1910
 Chalepus nigripictus Baly, 1885
 Chalepus nigrithorax Pic, 1931
 Chalepus nigrovirens (Chapuis, 1877)
 Chalepus notula (Chapuis, 1877)
 Chalepus obidosensis Pic, 1929
 Chalepus panici Uhmann, 1950
 Chalepus parananus Pic, 1927
 Chalepus pauli Pic, 1932
 Chalepus perplexus (Chapuis, 1877)
 Chalepus pici Descarpentries & Villiers, 1959
 Chalepus picturatus Spaeth, 1937
 Chalepus plebeius (Chapuis, 1877)
 Chalepus porosus (Germar, 1824)
 Chalepus pullus Weise, 1905
 Chalepus pusillus Weise, 1910
 Chalepus putzeysi (Chapuis, 1877)
 Chalepus quadricostatus (Chapuis, 1877)
 Chalepus ruficollis Pic, 1932
 Chalepus rufiventris (Suffrian, 1868)
 Chalepus rufogaster
 Chalepus sanguinicollis (Linnaeus, 1771)
 Chalepus sanguinipennis Uhmann, 1930
 Chalepus schmidti Uhmann, 1935
 Chalepus scutellaris Pic, 1931
 Chalepus scutellatus Uhmann, 1931
 Chalepus selectus Weise, 1911
 Chalepus similatus Baly, 1885
 Chalepus subcordiger Uhmann, 1935
 Chalepus subhumeralis Baly, 1885
 Chalepus submarginatus Pic, 1932
 Chalepus submetallicus Pic, 1931
 Chalepus subparallelus Baly, 1885
 Chalepus tappesi (Chapuis, 1877)
 Chalepus testaceiceps Pic, 1931
 Chalepus teutonicus Uhmann, 1943
 Chalepus titschacki Uhmann, 1931
 Chalepus trivittatus Pic, 1932
 Chalepus verticalis (Chapuis, 1877)
 Chalepus vicinalis Baly, 1885
 Chalepus viduus Weise, 1905
 Chalepus walshii (Crotch, 1873)
 Chalepus weyersi (Chapuis, 1877)
 Chalepus wygodzinskyi Uhmann, 1951
 Chalepus yucatanus Champion, 1894

References

Further reading

External links

 

Cassidinae
Articles created by Qbugbot